Ihsaas is a 1993 Maldivian drama film directed by Mohamed Hilmy and Ali Waheed. Produced by MAPA, the film stars Ismail Wajeeh, Reeko Moosa Manik, Hamid Wajeeh, Aminath Shiyaza, Ameena and Yadhiya Hilmy in pivotal roles.

Premise
Mohamed Unaiz (Ismail Wajeeh), an orphan who lost his family in a shipwreck, migrates to a foreign country for further studies and is arrested by a group of assassins for his alleged involvement in spying. With the help of Maldivian government, Unaiz is released from the jail and relocates to his island where he marries a divorcee, Shareefa, who domestically abuses him.

Cast 
 Ismail Wajeeh as Mohamed Unaiz
 Reeko Moosa Manik as Nasheed
 Hamid Wajeeh
 Aminath Shiyaza as Dr. Shan
 Ameena
 Yadhiya Hilmy
 Ibrahim Shakir as a doctor
 Koyya Hassan Manik as Aadhanu

Soundtrack

Accolades

References

1993 films
1993 drama films
Maldivian drama films
Dhivehi-language films